The Blazing Sun   is a 1954 Egyptian romance drama film directed by Youssef Chahine and written by Helmy Halim and Ali El Zorkani. It stars Omar Sharif and Faten Hamama. This was the first film role that Omar Sharif played. In 1996, during the Egyptian Cinema centennial, this film was selected one of the best 150 Egyptian film productions. It was presented in the 1954 Cannes Film Festival under the name The Blazing Sky. It was a box office hit in the Soviet Union, where it sold  tickets in 1956.

Plot 
Omar Sharif plays Ahmed Salam, an engineer and son of Saber Abdul Salam (Abdel Waress Assar), a sugar cane farm owner. In Egypt in 1951, Ahmed is congratulated by the peasant farmers after improving and increasing the production of sugar cane on the peasant farm. Taher Pasha, a wealthy land owner who runs a competing sugar cane production facility, feels threatened by the villager's newfound prosperity. Along with his nephew, Riad, the Pasha floods the peasant's sugar cane crops in order to protect his own wealth. After the peasant crops are destroyed, the village Sheikh is the only person to suspect that the Pasha is responsible.

Ahmed is in a love relationship with the Pasha's daughter, Amal (Faten Hamama), but due to their different social class, they hide their relationship. Riad asks the Pasha for his permission to marry Amal, but the Pasha refuses.

The Pasha soon learns of a heated dispute that occurred between Ahmed's father and the Sheikh. The Pasha uses this to his benefit, as he and Riad steal Saber Effendi's rifle and set up a conspiracy against Saber Effendi. The next day, the Sheikh is found murdered. Saber Effendi is immediately blamed by the angry villagers for his death and is found guilty by the court after testimony by Hassan, the only witness to Saber's innocence. Unbeknownst to the community, Hassan secretly conspired with the Pasha to kill the Sheikh. Hassan turns against Saber, and he is sentenced to death. While Ahmed searches for Hassan to clear his father's name, Selim, the Shiekh's son, prepares to kill Ahmed to further avenge the Sheikh's death. After a short pursuit by Ahmed, Hassan is struck by a train and killed. Saber is executed, and Ahmed, fearing his death, hides in an ancient temple in the desert with the help of Amal. Here, Amal reveals to Ahmed the truth about the Sheikh's murder.

Riad attempts to kill Ahmed in the temple, where Ahmed is simultaneously being pursued by Selim. Both Ahmed and Amal are wounded in the chase. Riad kills the Pasha, who confesses his crimes. Selim apologizes to Ahmed, and they both turn Riad over to the police. Ahmed and Amal embrace and walk off into the distance.

Main cast 
 Faten Hamama as Amal
 Omar Sharif as Ahmed
 Zaki Rostom as Taher Pasha
 Abdel Waress Assar as Ahmed's father
 Farid Shawqi as Reyad
 Hamdy Gheith as Selim

See also

References

External links 

1954 romantic drama films
1954 films
1950s Arabic-language films
Egyptian romantic drama films
Egyptian black-and-white films
Films directed by Youssef Chahine